Jenifer is Jenifer Bartoli's début album, released in 2002 in France, and in February 2007 in the U.S. It achieved success on the French and Belgian charts, reaching the top two in both. It spawned four successful singles, all of which were top ten hits in Jenifer's native country. The album was recorded in a mere three weeks.

Track listing

Album credits

Personnel
Angepier - keyboards, piano & programming ("Donne-moi le temps")
Valérie Belinga - backing vocals ("Des mots qui résonnent!")
Denis Benarrosh - percussion
Jean-François Berger - string arrangement & conducting, keyboards & programming
Bertrand Cervera - violin solo ("J'attends l'amour")
Roland Chosson - French horn ("Donne-moi le temps")
François Delabrière - additional guitar ("Nos points communs")
Christophe Deschamps - drums & percussion
Guillaume Eyango - backing vocals
Dominique Grimaldi - bass guitar ("Donne-moi le temps")
Pierre Jaconelli - guitar ("Donne-moi le temps" & "Secrets défenses")
Cyrille Lacrouts - cello solo ("J'attends l'amour" & "Je garde")
Murielle Lefebvre - backing vocals
Laurent Marimbert - string arrangement & conducting, keyboards & programming
Olivier Marly - guitar ("Je ne pourrai plus aimer")
Nicolas Neidhardt - keyboards & programming
Cyril Normand - French horn ("Donne-moi le temps")
Vincent Perrot - keyboards & programming ("Secrets défenses")
Benjamin Raffaëlli - guitar, keyboards & programming
François Rause - guitar ("Je ne pourrai plus aimer")
Stanislas Renoult - string arrangement & conducting ("Je ne pourrai plus aimer")
Philippe Russo - guitar ("Nos points communs")
Ian Thomas - drums ("Des mots qui résonnent!")
Marine Trévillot - backing vocals ("Je ne pourrai plus aimer")
Matthew Vaughan - programming ("Nos points communs")
Laurent Vernerey - bass guitar
Christophe Voisin - keyboards & programming ("Secrets défenses" & "Je ne pourrai plus aimer")

Production
"J'attends l'amour", "Au soleil", "Maintenant" & "Viens me voir" produced by Nicolas Neidhardt & Benjamin Raffaëlli
"Donne-moi le temps" produced by Pierre Jaconelli
"Secrets défenses" produced by Christophe Deschamps & Vincent Perrot
"Nos points communs" produced by Jean-François Berger & François Delabrière
"Je garde" & "Que reste-t-il?" produced by Laurent Marimbert
"Je ne pourrai plus aimer" produced by François Rause & Antoine Verlant
"Là où tu rêves" & "Des mots qui résonnent!" produced by Benjamin Raffaëlli
Engineered by Jean-Paul Gonnod at Studio Plus XXX, Paris
Assistant engineers - Xavier Bleu, Pierrick Devin, Gérard Noël-Pierre, Nino
Strings recorded by René Ameline at Studio Ferber, Paris
Strings recorded by Stéphane Prin & Pete Schwier at Studio Davout, Paris
Assistant engineers (strings) - Eymerick Castin (Studio Davout), Jeff Ginouvès & Benjamin Joubert (Studio Ferber)
String contractors - Christophe Briquet, Dominique Rouits, Marylène Vinciguerra
Additional recordings - Stéphane Briand, Nicolas Neidhardt, Pete Schwier at Aktion Entertainment, Studio Davout, Studio Guillaume Tell, Studio M49 & Studio Méga
ProTools editing by Jean-Paul Gonnod & Mickaël Rangeard
Mixed by François Delabrière at Studio Plus XXX
Mixed by Steve Forward ("Que reste-t-il?")
Assistant mixing - Xavier Bleu, Pierrick Devin ("Que reste-t-il?"), Nino
Mastered by Tony Cousins at Metropolis Mastering, London
Executive producer - Bertrand Lamblot

Design
Michel Sedan: photography
Happydesign: cover design

Charts and sales

Weekly charts

Year-end charts

Certifications

References

2002 debut albums
Jenifer (singer) albums